Michael Strogoff (Spanish: Miguel Strogoff) is a 1944 Mexican historical drama film directed by Miguel M. Delgado and starring Julián Soler, Lupita Tovar and Julio Villarreal. It is based on the 1876 novel Michael Strogoff by Jules Verne.

The film's sets were designed by the art director Manuel Fontanals.

Main cast
Julián Soler as Miguel Strogoff  
Lupita Tovar as Nadia Fedorova  
Julio Villarreal as Iván Ogareff  
Anita Blanch as Sangarra Petrova  
Andrés Soler as Jolivet  
Miguel Arenas as Czar  
Victoria Argota as Madre de Miguel  
Luis G. Barreiro as Harry Blount  
Charles Stevens as Secuaz de Tártaro  
Salvador Quiroz as Governor  
Francisco Jambrina as General 
Manuel Dondé as Tártaro  
Gerardo del Castillo
José Torvay as Tártaro

References

External links

1940s historical films
Mexican historical films
Films based on Michael Strogoff
Films directed by Miguel M. Delgado
Films set in Russia
Films set in the 19th century
Mexican black-and-white films
1940s Mexican films